Druzhnoye is a rural locality (a selo) in Romankautsky Selsoviet of Mazanovsky District, Amur Oblast, Russia. The population was 168 as of 2018. There are 4 streets.

Geography 
Druzhnoye is located 32 km south of Novokiyevsky Uval (the district's administrative centre) by road. Romankautsy is the nearest rural locality.

References 

Rural localities in Mazanovsky District